Useless is a 2007 documentary film directed by Jia Zhangke. It is Jia's second full-length documentary film after 2006's Dong. The film follows China's fashion and clothing industry. The film was produced by Jia Zhangke's own Xstream Pictures, in association with the China Film Association and the Mixmind Art and Design Company.

On review aggregator website Rotten Tomatoes, the film holds an approval rating of 71% based on 7 reviews, with an average rating of 5.80/10.

References

External links

Useless at the 2007 Toronto International Film Festival

Chinese documentary films
2000s Mandarin-language films
Films directed by Jia Zhangke
Documentary films about China
Films about fashion
2007 documentary films
2007 in fashion